Khan Kasaray-e Olya (also Romanized as Khān Kasarāy-e ‘Olyā; also known as Khāneh Kāsarāy) is a village in Rahimabad Rural District, Rahimabad District, Rudsar County, Gilan Province, Iran. At the 2006 census, its population was 54, in 12 families.

References 

Populated places in Rudsar County